The AFC Asian Cup is an association football competition established in 1956. It is contested by the men's national teams of the members of the Asian Football Confederation (AFC), the sport's Asian governing body, and takes place generally every four years. The winners of the first tournament were South Korea, who won in a round-robin style tournament, The first final was in 1972, where Iran defeated South Korea 2–1 after extra time in Bangkok. The most recent final, hosted in Abu Dhabi in 2019, saw Qatar defeat Japan 3–1.

The Asian Cup final is the last match of the competition and the result determines which country's team is declared Asian champion. As of the 2019 tournament, if after 90 minutes of regular play the score is a draw, an additional 30-minute period of play, called extra time, is added. If such a game is still tied after extra time, it is decided by penalty shoot-out. The team that wins the penalty shoot-out are then declared champions. The 13 finals to-date have produced five matches go into extra-time, and two of those further being decided by a penalty shoot-out. The winners are awarded the Asian Cup trophy.

Japan is the most successful team at the tournament, winning it four times. Iran and Saudi Arabia both have three titles, South Korea have two and Israel, Kuwait, Iraq, Australia and Qatar have one a-piece.

List of finals 

 The "Year" column refers to the year the European Championship tournament was held, and wikilinks to the article about that tournament.
 Links in the "Winners" and "Runners-up" columns point to the articles for the national football teams of the countries, not the articles for the countries.
 The wikilinks in the "Final score" column point to the article about that tournament's final game.
 Source:

Results by nation 

1 = Israel was expelled from the AFC in the early 1970s and eventually became a member of UEFA.

Footnotes

See also 

 List of FIFA Confederations Cup finals
 List of FIFA World Cup finals

References 

 
AFC Asian Cup